Zack Parker is an American director and screenwriter. He was described as a "one-man Hollywood" by The New York Times for his low-budget high-concept films with unnerving themes. He was raised in the small midwestern town of Richmond, Indiana where he continues to live with his three children and wife.

Career
Parker attended University of California where he first began working as a production assistant on the show Black Scorpion. However, it wasn't until working with Margo Martindale on his third film "Scalene" that he became known for direction. Parker is perhaps best known for directing and writing Proxy which premiered at the 2013 Toronto International Film Festival and stars Kristina Klebe, Alexa Havins and Joe Swanberg. In an interview with Filmmaker Magazine, Zack reveals he finds most of his financing from investors in the Midwest, which he finds easier than raising money in New York, Los Angeles or Chicago.

Filmography 

, Parker has directed 4 full-length films.

References

External links
 

Living people
American film directors
American male screenwriters

Year of birth missing (living people)